Florida Agriculture & Mechanical Hospital (1911-1971) was the first institution in Florida providing medical care to African Americans, who, during the segregation period, were not permitted to receive care at whites-only hospitals. (See Tallahassee Memorial HealthCare on Tallahassee's other hospitals of the period.) There was no other such institution within  of Tallahassee. In 1940, "less than a dozen" counties in Florida had hospital facilities for Negroes.

Founding
The hospital was originally designated a sanitarium, had 19 beds, and was created to allow Florida A&M University (FAMU) to establish a nursing program. It was housed in a wooden building located slightly NW of the brick building, with 105 beds, which replaced it in 1950. Funding to build the hospital was provided in part to avoid integration at Tallahassee Memorial Hospital, by creating a "separate but equal" facility. (See Gibbs Junior College for other such efforts in Florida.) It was officially dedicated as a hospital in 1951, although since 1946 it was named the FAMC Hospital, Health Center and Nursing School. Like most hospitals serving African Americans, it was chronically underfunded; Tallahassee levied a tax on residents to support the whites-only hospital, but refused to distribute any of the funds to the FAMU hospital, whose patients were almost exclusively African Americans.

Closure
The hospital closed as a result of the Civil Rights Act of 1964, and the federal government's threat to withhold Medicare funding from both the FAMU hospital and Tallahassee Memorial Hospital if racial segregation continued. Tallahassee Memorial started admitting black patients, and federal and state funding which previously supported the FAMU Hospital was transferred to Tallahassee Memorial. When state funding was ended in 1967, the name was changed to Tallahassee A&M Hospital and it was leased to the city and county from 1967 to 1970, renewed for 1970-72. On December 24, 1971, citing unsustainable losses, the Hospital Board announced that it was closing down the hospital, which at that time had three patients housed there. FAMU President Dr. B. L. Perry, Jr., cited "the unwillingness of white doctors to commit patients to it. Concurrent with this problem was the unavailability of black doctors in this community". He also cited the low salary for nurses, which did not meet the requirements of the minimum wage and hour law and did not attract applicants. As was typical of racial desegregation in the U.S., it was the black facility that closed, and the employees lost their jobs.

Two identical historical markers commemorating the hospital were erected in 2013. One is in front of the former hospital building. The other, at an entrance to the campus, is on the SW corner of the intersection of Palmer Avenue and South Adams Street. The marker (note that the transcriptions of its text in the references just given are not completely accurate) reads as follows:
The first healthcare facility built in Florida for African-Americans [ sic ] was the Florida A&M College (FAMC) Hospital, known as the Florida A&M University (FAMU) Hospital after 1953. The school's original two-story, 19-bed wooden sanitarium was built in 1911 (since demolished), and provided medical care to patients of all races living in Leon and surrounding counties. It was supervised by Jennie Virginia Hilyer, RN, a graduate of Freedmen's Hospital in Washington, D.C., later renamed Howard University Hospital. In 1926, Leonard H.B. Foote, MD, a graduate of Howard University Medical School, became hospital administrator. Foote established FAMC's School of Nursing in 1936, the first baccalaureate nursing program in Florida. He led a 10-year campaign to construct a new modern brick hospital, which opened in 1950. As a major medical center, the hospital provided clinical training for students and opportunities for research. After the withdrawal of federal and state support, the doors of the hospital closed on December 11, 1971. Today, the hospital's legacy continues through Florida A&M University's School of Nursing, College of Pharmacy, and School of Allied Health Sciences.

The former hospital is currently (2017) the Foote-Hilyer Administration Building. It continues to house the university's student health center.

References

Florida A&M University
History of Tallahassee, Florida
Defunct hospitals in Florida
Nursing schools in Florida
African-American history of Florida
Historically black hospitals in the United States
Buildings and structures in Tallahassee, Florida
Historic buildings and structures in the United States
Hospitals disestablished in 1971
Hospitals established in 1911
1911 establishments in Florida
1971 disestablishments in Florida
1946 establishments in Florida